Henry Lee Morey (April 8, 1841 – December 29, 1902) was an officer in the United States Army during the American Civil War and a politician and U.S. Congressman after the war.

Early life and career
Henry L. Morey was born in Milford Township near Collinsville, Butler County, Ohio. He was a son of William and Derexa (Whitcomb) Morey, and the great-grandson of Revolutionary War officer Silas Morey and grandson of Revolutionary soldier Anthony Whitcomb. William Morey in his early life was a hatter and to buy furs he occasionally visited New Orleans, where he witnessed the workings of slavery. He abhorred what he saw and became a radical abolitionist. Returning to Ohio, William opened his home as part of the Underground Railroad, and was well known as a friend of the black man.

Henry received his education in the local public schools and the Morning Sun Academy at the village of Rising Sun. He then entered Miami University at Oxford, Ohio.

Civil War
On the day after the fall of Fort Sumter, Morey left the university and enlisted as a member of the University Rifles, a military organization attached to the 20th Ohio Infantry, serving an enlistment of three months in West Virginia under General Robert C. Schenck.

Morey then enlisted in the 75th Ohio Volunteer Infantry for a term of three years, and served under Generals Franz Sigel in the Shenandoah Valley of Virginia, John Pope and Edward Hatch in Florida and Quincy A. Gillmore at the siege of Charleston. He was successively promoted corporal, sergeant, second lieutenant, first lieutenant, and captain. Three of his brothers, Oliver P., Joseph W., and James E. Morey, also served in the Union Army.

He took part in the engagement at Monterey. He commanded his company in engagements at Franklin, Battle of McDowell and Shaw's Ridge, Strasburg, Battle of Cross Keys, Battle of Cedar Mountain, Battle of Rappahannock Station I (Freeman's Ford, Sulphur Springs, and Waterloo Bridge), Second Battle of Bull Run, Battle of Aldie and Battle of Chancellorsville in Virginia. He was taken prisoner at the battle of Chancellorsville and confined in the notorious Libby Prison until exchanged. He again commanded his company in the battles of Battle of Fort Wagner, Morris Island, Fort Gregg and in the siege of Fort Sumter in South Carolina and engagements at Camp Baldwin and Battle of Gainesville in Florida. He was mustered out in 1865. On April 25, 1865, he married Mary M. Campbell, the daughter of an Ohio state senator.

Postbellum career
Morey then undertook the study of law and was graduated from the Indianapolis Law School in 1867 and was admitted to the Ohio bar, commencing practice in Hamilton, Ohio, in partnership with one of his six brothers. His wife Mary died July 1, 1867, in Hamilton. On February 26, 1873, he was married to Ella R. Campbell, sister of his first wife.

Morey was elected as a Republican to two terms as city solicitor of Hamilton (1871–1875). He was also elected prosecuting attorney of Butler County, Ohio, in 1873, serving concurrently. In 1875, he ran unsuccessfully for the Ohio Senate. H. L. Morey was a delegate to the Republican National Convention in 1876.

In 1880, he was elected as a Republican from Ohio's third district to the Forty-seventh Congress. In 1882, following the reapportionment as a result of the 1880 census, he ran in Ohio's seventh district and presented credentials as a Member-elect to the Forty-eighth Congress, serving until June 20, 1884. James E. Campbell successfully contested the election and was seated June 21, 1884. He was a delegate to the Republican National Convention in 1884. In 1888, Morey was again elected from Ohio's seventh district to the Fifty-first Congress. However, back in the Third district the following term, he was an unsuccessful candidate for reelection in 1890.

After his last term in Congress, Morey resumed the practice of law in Hamilton. He was a Mason, having advanced to the Knight Templar degree. He also was an Odd Fellow, a Knight of Pythias and a member of the Royal Arcanum. He died in 1902 and was interred in Greenwood Cemetery.

Henry L. Morey was a cousin of James Whitcomb, governor of Indiana (1843–1848) and United States Senator from Indiana (1849–1852).

See also

References
  Retrieved on 2008-02-14
 Taylor, William A. Ohio in Congress from 1803 to 1901. Columbus, Ohio: The XX Century Publishing Company, 1900.
 History of the Republican Party in Ohio. Chicago: Lewis Publishing Co., 1898, 1579 pgs.
 A History and Biographical Cyclopaedia of Butler County Ohio. Cincinnati, Ohio: Western Biographical Publishing Company, 1882.

People from Butler County, Ohio
American Civil War prisoners of war
Union Army officers
Miami University alumni
American milliners
1841 births
1902 deaths
County district attorneys in Ohio
People of Ohio in the American Civil War
Underground Railroad people
Burials at Greenwood Cemetery (Hamilton, Ohio)
19th-century American politicians
Activists from Ohio
Republican Party members of the United States House of Representatives from Ohio
20th-century African-American people